Commonhold is a system of property ownership in England and Wales. It involves the indefinite freehold tenure of part of a multi-occupancy building (typically a flat) with shared ownership of and responsibility for common areas and services. It has features of the strata title and the condominium systems, which exist in Australia and the United States respectively. It was introduced by the Commonhold and Leasehold Reform Act 2002 as an alternative to leasehold, and was the first new type of legal estate to be introduced in English law since 1925.

An important difference between commonholds and leaseholds (leases) is that a commonholds is indefinite in time, unlike a leasehold which is only granted for a fixed period of time (the term). As a consequence, a commonhold title is not a depreciating asset, whereas leaseholds lose values as the end of their term (term of years or in extraneous documents sometimes existence) approaches.

In the years since the 2002 Act became law, only a handful of commonholds have been registered, whilst hundreds of thousands of long leases have been granted during the same period. As of 3 June 2009, there were 12 commonhold residential developments comprising 97 units (homes) in England and one commonhold residential development comprising 30 units (homes) in Wales.

Where freehold houses should be subjected to positive covenants which force their owners contribute to communal maintenance, such as in garden squares, as few such duties can attach to freeholds, access to such areas can be physically restricted to those who own that area, commonly through a residents' management company.  Such a company, if the land was owned by the original landlord such as a developer, may come into the hands of the lessees (tenants) through a statutory process leading to legal agreements or a court order which creates a limited liability right to manage (also known as an RTM) company.  A common alternative has been rentcharges where truly necessary services or contributions need to be made which cannot devolve to a local authority or statutory undertaker through adoption.

See also
Private housing estates in Hong Kong

References

Property law
English law
Condominium
English property law